WVID (90.3 FM), branded on-air as Vid 90, is a radio station broadcasting a Jazz format. Licensed to Añasco, Puerto Rico, it serves the Puerto Rico area. The station is currently owned by Centro Colegial Cristiano, Inc., which is presided by Rev. Oscar Correa Agosto. WVID is mainly dedicated to the various styles of Jazz and educational programming. The station has an ERP of 14,500 watts which makes it the third most powerful station of its area. WVID is mainly dedicated to the various styles of Jazz. WVID has an ultra target of 35, while it is very popular in the 25–49 demographic. The station shares around 7 percent of the area's total audience. (Similarly targeted stations usually share around 1.5 percent of their total market. Comparatively, the most popular station in the area shares around 11% of the total market.)

WVID has an exclusive programming dedicated mainly to Jazz music, and it is the only station in Puerto Rico offering this type of programming 24 hours 7 days a week. The programming style is now very appealing to the younger demographics making WVID somewhat of a phenomenon and because of this, has recently captured the attention of mayor companies and performers as well. WVID is the matrix station for the second most popular Jazz Fest in Puerto Rico, The Mayagüez Jazz Fest.

Because of its targeted audience and unique programming WVID was recently selected among the stations in the island, to showcase various features in the Central American and Caribbean games, an honor usually reserved for the largest stations. The station represented Puerto Rico's radio in the international media. WVID is also involved in sports. Its programming is available via the Internet on its website, www.vid90.com.

See also
 List of jazz radio stations in the United States

External links
 
 
 

VID
Radio stations established in 1982
Añasco, Puerto Rico
1982 establishments in Puerto Rico
Jazz radio stations